John Charles Van Dyke (1856–1932) was an American art historian, critic, and nature writer. He was born at New Brunswick, New Jersey, studied at Columbia, and for many years in Europe. He was admitted to the New York State Bar Association in 1877, but never practiced law.

In 1878, Van Dyke was appointed the librarian of the Gardner Sage Library at the New Brunswick Theological Seminary, and in 1891 as a professor of art history at Rutgers College (now Rutgers, The State University of New Jersey).  With his appointment, the Rutgers president's residence was converted to classroom and studio space for the college's Department of Fine Arts. He was elected to the National Institute of Arts and Letters in 1908.

Van Dyke wrote a series of critical guide books: New Guides to Old Masters. He edited Modern French Masters (1896); Old Dutch and Flemish Masters (1901); Old English Masters; and a series of histories covering the history of art in America.

In 1901, Van Dyke published "The Desert" through which Americans "'discovered' the Southwest, its Indians, strange plants, and exotic animals.  Discovered, too, the first and still the best book to praise the arid lands.  After nearly a century Van Dyke remains the grandfather of almost all American desert writers...."

Van Dyke was the son of Judge John Van Dyke, and great grandson of John Honeyman, a spy for George Washington who played a critical role at the battle of Trenton. He was also the uncle of film director W.S. Van Dyke.

Publications
 How to Judge a Picture (1888)
 Art for Art's Sake (1893)
 A History of Painting (1894; new edition, 1915)
 Rembrandt and his school; a critical study of the master and his pupils with a new assignment of their pictures (1923)
 The Meadows: Familiar Studies of the Commonplace (1926)
 Nature for its Own Sake (1898; fourth edition, 1906)
     With J. Smeaton Chase (photographs – 1918 ed.) (1980 ed.  Gibbs M. Smith, Inc. / Peregrine Smith Books: Salt Lake City, xxvii + 233|)
 The Opal Sea: Continued Studies in Impressions and Appearances (1906)
 The Open Spaces: Incidents of Nights and Days under the Blue Sky (1922)
 Studies in Pictures (1907)
 The Money God (1908)
 The Raritan: Notes on a River and a Family (1915)
 The Mountain (1916)
 The Grand Canyon of the Colorado (1920)
In the West Indies (1932)
  Edited by Peter Wild
 Reviewed by: Ingham, Zita (March 22, 1995). "The Autobiography of John C. Van Dyke: A Personal Narrative of American Life, 1861–1931". Nineteenth-Century Prose

Further reading

References

External links

 
 
 

1856 births
1932 deaths
American art historians
American art critics
American book editors
Columbia University alumni
Writers from New Brunswick, New Jersey
Rutgers University faculty
American people of Dutch descent
Members of the American Academy of Arts and Letters
Historians from New Jersey